Pierre Hilzim is a chef in New Orleans and head of Kajun Kettle Foods. He created crawfish Monica, named after his wife Monica Davidson.

References

External links
Kajun Kettle Foods website

American chefs
American male chefs
Living people
Year of birth missing (living people)